IL-1 may refer to:

 Interleukin 1, a protein
 Illinois's 1st congressional district
 Illinois Route 1
 Building 1 of Infinite Loop (street), the headquarters of Apple Inc.
 Ilyushin Il-1, a Soviet fighter prototype